The Allen County Poor Farm in Scottsville, Kentucky was a Works Progress Administration project in 1936.  It was listed on the National Register of Historic Places in 1991.

It is a modest five-bay building with "a very stylized 'institutional' Colonial Revival style. The building's style is plain and rather utilitarian but it does have some applied ornamentation. In fact it closely resembles school buildings constructed as part of public works projects during the same period and may indeed be an adaptation of an educational building floor plan."

References

		
National Register of Historic Places in Allen County, Kentucky
Colonial Revival architecture in Kentucky
Buildings and structures completed in 1936
1936 establishments in Kentucky
Works Progress Administration in Kentucky
Poor farms